The National Directorate of Taxes and Customs is a government agency responsible for financial regulation and tax collection in Colombia. The agency falls under the Ministry of Finance and Public Credit and is based in Bogotá.

References

External links 
 Official site

Government agencies of Colombia
Revenue services
Civil registries
Customs services
Taxation in Colombia
Foreign trade of Colombia